Paul Swinnerton (born 1958) is a male retired British cyclist.

Cycling career
Swinnerton was a two times winner of the British National Track Championships in 1979 and 1981 and turned professional in 1984.

He represented England in the 1,000 metres match sprint and the 1 km time trial, at the 1978 Commonwealth Games in Edmonton, Alberta, Canada.

Family
The Swinnerton family were a cycling family, Swinnerton Cycles was founded in 1915, in Victoria Road, Fenton, Stoke-on-Trent. Roy Swinnerton (1925-2013 and a national grass champion in 1956) and his wife Doris (née Salt) took over the shop in 1956 and set up a cycling club called Stoke ACCS during 1970. They had seven children.

Paul's twin sister Catherine was a two times British road race champion, Bernadette won a world silver medal, Margaret, Mark and Bernard were all British internationals and Frances also competed for the club.

References

Living people
1958 births
British male cyclists
Cyclists at the 1978 Commonwealth Games
Commonwealth Games competitors for England